English Rock is a rock outcrop near the foot of the western slope of Mount Frakes, in the Crary Mountains of Marie Byrd Land. It was mapped by the United States Geological Survey from ground surveys and U.S. Navy aerial photography, 1959–66, and was named by the Advisory Committee on Antarctic Names for Claude L. English, Jr., U.S. Navy helicopter crew with Squadron VXE-6 during Operation Deep Freeze in 1970; he also deployed with the Squadron during Deep Freeze 1961, 1962 and 1965.

References 

Rock formations of Marie Byrd Land
Crary Mountains